Oliver Gilbert III is an American politician and current Miami-Dade County Commissioner for District 1. He is also the former mayor of Miami Gardens.

Career 
Gilbert received a B.A. in Criminal Justice from Florida A&M University and a J.D. from University of Miami School of Law. He entered politics early out of law school in 2000, when then-state representative Dorothy Bendross-Mindingall hired him as a legislative aide. He then worked as deputy of policy for former US attorney general Janet Reno's gubernatorial campaign. A couple years later, after working first as a prosecutor and then in private practice, he vied for the mayoralty of the newly incorporated City of Miami Gardens in 2003 where he lost. He was appointed to the Miami Gardens council in 2008 and 4 years later was elected mayor, the second African-American to hold the position. Miami Gardens is Florida's largest city with a majority African American population and the 3rd largest city in Miami-Dade County.

When running for Miami-Dade County Commission he faced Sybrina Fulton, the mother of Trayvon Martin, who was killed by George Zimmerman in 2013. There were notable as people like Hillary Clinton, Cory Booker, Elizabeth Warren and other high ranking figures in the Democratic Party who endorsed Fulton. However, Gilbert won a close race in August winning 50.5%, as such a runoff was not needed.

Gilbert is also known for his love of bowties and frequently wears them. He is a brother in Omega Psi Phi fraternity.

References

1972 births
Living people
Government of Miami-Dade County, Florida
Mayors of Miami-Dade County, Florida
Florida Democrats
African-American mayors in Florida
University of Miami School of Law alumni
Florida A&M University alumni
21st-century African-American people
20th-century African-American people